The 2016–17 Memphis Grizzlies season was the 22nd season of the franchise in the National Basketball Association (NBA). On May 7, 2016, the Memphis Grizzlies fired Dave Joerger after the team was swept in the first round of the playoffs. On May 29, 2016, David Fizdale was hired as the head coach.

The Grizzlies finished the regular season with a 43–39 record, securing the 7th seed. In the playoffs, they faced off against the San Antonio Spurs in the First Round, where they lost in six games. Following the season, Zach Randolph signed as a free agent with the Sacramento Kings, along with Vince Carter. Tony Allen also left the team following the season, signing with the New Orleans Pelicans as a free agent.

Until the 2020-21 NBA season, this marked the last time the Grizzlies made the playoffs.

Draft

Roster

Standings

Division

Conference

Game log

Pre-season

|- style="background:#cfc;"
| 1
| October 3
| Orlando
| 
| Wade Baldwin IV (15)
| Ennis, Randolph, Stephens (5)
| Andrew Harrison (6)
| FedExForum18,119
| 1–0
|- style="background:#fcc;"
| 2
| October 6
| Atlanta
| 
| Troy Williams (15)
| D.J. Stephens (8)
| Wade Baldwin IV (4)
| FedExForum13,246
| 1–1
|- style="background:#cfc;"
| 3
| October 11
| Philadelphia
| 
| Troy Williams (21)
| JaMychal Green (11)
| Mike Conley Jr. (6)
| FedExForum14,248
| 2–1
|- style="background:#cfc;"
| 4
| October 13
| @ Oklahoma City
| 
| Marc Gasol (21)
| Zach Randolph (8)
| Mike Conley Jr. (7)
| Chesapeake Energy Arena17,022
| 3–1
|- style="background:#cfc;"
| 5
| October 15
| @ Houston
| 
| Troy Williams (23)
| Vince Hunter (10)
| Mike Conley Jr. (7)
| Target Center14,690
| 4–1
|- style="background:#fcc;"
| 6
| October 19
| @ Minnesota
| 
| Wayne Selden Jr. (17)
| Zach Randolph (9)
| Crawford, Selden Jr. (3)
| Toyota Center9,594
| 4–2

Regular season

|- style="background:#cfc"
| 1
| October 26
| Minnesota
| 
| Mike Conley Jr. (24)
| Zach Randolph (11)
| Wade Baldwin IV (6)
| FedExForum18,119
| 1–0
|- style="background:#fcc"
| 2
| October 29
| @ New York
| 
| Marc Gasol (20)
| JaMychal Green (8)
| Mike Conley Jr. (5)
| Madison Square Garden19,812
| 1–1
|- style="background:#cfc"
| 3
| October 30
| Washington
| 
| Mike Conley Jr. (24)
| James Ennis (12)
| Mike Conley Jr. (11)
| FedExForum15,573
| 2–1

|- style="background:#fcc"
| 4
| November 1
| @ Minnesota
| 
| Deyonta Davis (17)
| Deyonta Davis (6)
| Andrew Harrison (5)
| Target Center14,774
| 2–2
|- style="background:#cfc"
| 5
| November 2
| New Orleans
| 
| JaMychal Green (21)
| Marc Gasol (10)
| Marc Gasol (6)
| FedExForum15,881
| 3–2
|- style="background:#fcc;"
| 6
| November 4
| L. A. Clippers
| 
| Mike Conley Jr. (30)
| James Ennis (11)
| Mike Conley Jr. (10)
| FedExForum17,115
| 3–3
|- style="background:#fcc;"
| 7
| November 6
| Portland
| 
| Marc Gasol (21)
| JaMychal Green (8)
| Mike Conley Jr. (7)
| FedExForum16,233
| 3–4
|- style="background:#cfc;"
| 8
| November 8
| Denver
| 
| Vince Carter (20)
| Zach Randolph (8)
| Mike Conley Jr. (7)
| FedExForum15,109
| 4–4
|- style="background:#fcc"
| 9
| November 12
| @ Milwaukee
| 
| Marc Gasol (18)
| Zach Randolph (7)
| Marc Gasol (6)
| BMO Harris Bradley Center14,327
| 4–5
|- style="background:#cfc"
| 10
| November 14
| @ Utah
| 
| Marc Gasol (22)
| Zach Randolph (10)
| Mike Conley Jr. (8)
| Vivint Smart Home Arena18,176
| 5–5
|- style="background:#cfc"
| 11
| November 16
| @ L.A. Clippers
| 
| Mike Conley Jr. (30)
| JaMychal Green (10)
| Mike Conley Jr. (8)
| Staples Center19,060
| 6–5
|- style="background:#cfc"
| 12
| November 18
| @ Dallas
| 
| Chandler Parsons (12)
| JaMychal Green (12)
| James Ennis (4)
| American Airlines Center19,715
| 7–5
|- style="background:#cfc"
| 13
| November 19
| Minnesota
| 
| JaMychal Green (19)
| JaMychal Green (8)
| Andrew Harrison (7)
| FedExForum17,112
| 8–5
|- style="background:#cfc"
| 14
| November 21
| @ Charlotte
| 
| Mike Conley Jr. (31)
| Randolph, Gasol, Green (8)
| Marc Gasol (9)
| Spectrum Center14,181
| 9–5
|- style="background:#cfc"
| 15
| November 23
| @ Philadelphia
| 
| Marc Gasol (27)
| JaMychal Green (11)
| Mike Conley Jr. (9)
| Wells Fargo Center15,880
| 10–5
|- style="background:#fcc"
| 16
| November 25
| Miami
| 
| Mike Conley Jr. (16)
| Jarell Martin (12)
| Andrew Harrison (7)
| FedExForum17,222
| 10–6
|- style="background:#cfc"
| 17
| November 26
| @ Miami
| 
| Marc Gasol (28)
| Tony Allen (8)
| Mike Conley Jr. (7)
| American Airlines Arena19,600
| 11–6
|- style="background:#fcc"
| 18
| November 28
| Charlotte
| 
| Marc Gasol (19)
| Jarell Martin (12)
| Mike Conley Jr. (5)
| FedExForum13,143
| 11–7
|- style="background:#fcc"
| 19
| November 30
| @ Toronto
| 
| Andrew Harrison (21)
| Marc Gasol (8)
| Andrew Harrison (4)
| Air Canada Centre19,800
| 11–8

|- style="background:#cfc;"
| 20
| December 1
| Orlando
| 
| Marc Gasol (25)
| Jarell Martin (10)
| Andrew Harrison (8)
| FedExForum13,344
| 12–8
|- style="background:#cfc;"
| 21
| December 3
| L. A. Lakers
| 
| Troy Daniels (31)
| JaMychal Green (13)
| Marc Gasol (8)
| FedExForum17,017
| 13–8
|- style="background:#cfc;"
| 22
| December 5
| @ New Orleans
| 
| Troy Daniels (29)
| JaMychal Green (15)
| Marc Gasol (11)
| Smoothie King Center13,795
| 14–8
|- style="background:#cfc;"
| 23
| December 6
| Philadelphia
| 
| Marc Gasol (26)
| Zach Randolph (14)
| Andrew Harrison (4)
| FedEx Forum 13,521
| 15–8
|- style="background:#cfc;"
| 24
| December 8
| Portland
| 
| Marc Gasol (36)
| JaMychal Green (18)
| Harrison, Douglas (3)
| FedExForum14,317
| 16–8
|- style="background:#cfc;"
| 25
| December 10
| Golden State
| 
| Gasol, Allen (19)
| JaMychal Green (10)
| Marc Gasol (6)
| FedExForum18,119
| 17−8
|- style= "background:#fcc;"
| 26
| December 13
| @ Cleveland
| 
| Zach Randolph (18)
| Jarell Martin (10)
| Andrew Harrison (4)
| Quicken Loans Arena20,562
| 17–9
|- style= "background:#cfc;"
| 27
| December 14
| Cleveland
| 
| Troy Daniels (20)
| Marc Gasol (11)
| Toney Douglas (5)
| FedEx Forum 17,449
| 18–9
|- style="background:#fcc;"
| 28
| December 16
| Sacramento
| 
| Marc Gasol (20)
| Allen, Randolph (9)
| Mike Conley Jr. (6)
| FedExForum15,987
| 18–10
|- style="background:#fcc;"
| 29
| December 18
| Utah
| 
| Mike Conley Jr. (14)
| Green, Randolph (11)
| Conley Jr., Gasol (4)
| FedExForum15,862
| 18–11
|- style="background:#fcc;"
| 30
| December 20
| Boston
| 
| Daniels, Gasol (24)
| JaMychal Green (12)
| Mike Conley Jr. (8)
| FedExForum16,519
| 18–12
|- style="background:#cfc;"
| 31
| December 21
| @ Detroit
|  
| Marc Gasol (38)
| JaMychal Green (9)
| Andrew Harrison (6)
| The Palace of Auburn Hills16,033
| 19–12
|- style="background:#cfc;"
| 32
| December 23
| Houston
|  
| Mike Conley Jr. (24)
| Green, Gasol, Randolph (5)
| Andrew Harrison (6)
| FedExForum17,454
| 20–12
|- style="background:#fcc;"
| 33
| December 26
| @ Orlando
|  
| Mike Conley Jr. (17)
| Jarell Martin (8)
| Mike Conley Jr. (4)
| Amway Center17,104
| 20–13
|-style="background:#fcc;"
| 34
| December 27
| @ Boston
| 
| Marc Gasol (26)
| Zach Randolph (10)
| Marc Gasol (9)
| TD Garden18,624
| 20–14
|- style="background:#cfc;"
| 35
| December 29
| Oklahoma City 
|  
| Marc Gasol (25)
| Tony Allen (9)
| Baldwin IV, Carter (4)
| FedEx Forum18,119
| 21–14
|- style="background:#cfc;"
| 36
| December 31
| @ Sacramento
| 
| Mike Conley Jr. (22)
| Mike Conley Jr. (8)
| Andrew Harrison (6)
| Golden 1 Center17,608
| 22–14

|- style="background:#fcc;"
| 37
| January 3
| @ L. A. Lakers
| 
| Marc Gasol (22)
| Zach Randolph (9)
| Marc Gasol (7)
| Staples Center18,997
| 22–15
|- style="background:#fcc;"
| 38 
| January 4
| @ L. A. Clippers
| 
| Marc Gasol (23)
| Conley Jr., Carter (7)
| Mike Conley Jr. (12)
| Staples Center19,060
| 22–16
|- style="background:#cfc;"
| 39
| January 6
| @ Golden State
|  
| Mike Conley Jr. (27)
| Tony Allen (12)
| Mike Conley Jr. (12)
| Oracle Arena19,596
| 23−16
|- style="background:#cfc;"
| 40
| January 8
| Utah
|
| Mike Conley Jr. (19)
| Zach Randolph (11)
| Mike Conley Jr. (9)
| FedExForum16,112
| 24−16
|- style="background:#fcc;"
| 41
| January 11
| @ Oklahoma City
| 
| Mike Conley Jr. (22)
| JaMychal Green (10)
| Marc Gasol (7)
| Chesapeake Energy Arena 11,765
| 24–17
|- style="background:#cfc;"
| 42
| January 13
| @ Houston
| 
| Tony Allen (22)
| Zach Randolph (12)
| Mike Conley Jr. (9)
| Toyota Center18,055
| 25–17
|- style="background:#fcc;"
| 43
| January 15
| Chicago
| 
| Mike Conley Jr. (28)
| Zach Randolph (16)
| Mike Conley Jr. (8)
| FedExForum18,119
| 25–18
|- style="background:#fcc;"
| 44
| January 18
| @ Washington
| 
| Marc Gasol (28)
| JaMychal Green (13)
| Marc Gasol (7)
| Verizon Center15,079
| 25–19
|- style= "background:#cfc;"
| 45
| January 20
| Sacramento
| 
| Marc Gasol (28)
| Allen, Randolph (10)
| Mike Conley Jr. (8)
| FedExForum16,991
| 26–19
|- style="background:#fcc;"
| 46
| January 21
| Houston
| 
| Marc Gasol (32)
| JaMychal Green (9)
| Mike Conley Jr. (6)
| FedExForum18,119
| 26–20
|- style="background:#cfc;"
| 47
| January 25
| Toronto
| 
| Marc Gasol (42)
| Tony Allen (11)
| Mike Conley Jr. (5)
| FedExForum15,904
| 27–20
|- style="background:#fcc;"
| 48
| January 27
| @ Portland
| 
| Marc Gasol (32)
| Zach Randolph (13)
| Mike Conley Jr. (10)
| Moda Center19,558
| 27–21
|- style="background:#cfc;"
| 49
| January 28
| @ Utah
| 
| Zach Randolph (28)
| Zach Randolph (9)
| Marc Gasol (5)
| Vivint Smart Home Arena19,911
| 28–21
|- style="background:#cfc;"
| 50
| January 30
| @ Phoenix
| 
| Mike Conley Jr. (38)
| JaMychal Green (8)
| Mike Conley Jr. (9)
| Talking Stick Resort Arena16,332
| 29–21

|- style="background:#cfc;"
| 51
| February 1
| @ Denver
| 
| Marc Gasol (24)
| JaMychal Green (8)
| Andrew Harrison (6)
| Pepsi Center12,020
| 30–21
|- style="background:#fcc;"
| 52
| February 3
| @ Oklahoma City
| 
| Marc Gasol (31)
| Zach Randolph (10)
| Marc Gasol (8)
| Chesapeake Energy Arena18,203
| 30–22
|- style= "background:#cfc;"
| 53
| February 4
| @ Minnesota
| 
| JaMychal Green (29)
| Zach Randolph (10)
| Mike Conley Jr. (8)
| Target Center 15,081
| 31–22
|- style="background:#cfc;"
| 54
| February 6
| San Antonio
| 
| Gasol, Randolph (15)
| Marc Gasol (8)
| Mike Conley Jr. (9)
| FedExForum16,708
| 32–22
|- style="background:#cfc;"
| 55
| February 8
| Phoenix
| 
| Mike Conley Jr. (23)
| JaMychal Green (10)
| Chandler Parsons (7)
| FedExForum16,044
| 33–22
|- style="background:#fcc;"
| 56
| February 10
| Golden State
| 
| Mike Conley Jr. (20)
| Zach Randolph (13)
| Mike Conley Jr. (9)
| FedExForum18,119
| 33–23
|- style="background:#cfc;"
| 57
| February 13
| @ Brooklyn
| 
| Mike Conley Jr. (32)
| Marc Gasol (9)
| Marc Gasol (8)
| Barclays Center13,597
| 34–23
|- style="background:#fcc;"
| 58
| February 15
| New Orleans
| 
| Mike Conley Jr. (17)
| Marc Gasol (12)
| Marc Gasol (9)
| FedExForum16,145
| 34–24
|- style="background:#fcc;"
| 59
| February 24
| @ Indiana
| 
| Troy Daniels (13)
| Zach Randolph (8)
| Mike Conley Jr. (7)
| Bankers Life Fieldhouse17,923
| 34–25
|- style="background:#cfc;"
| 60
| February 26
| @ Denver
| 
| Mike Conley Jr. (31)
| Zach Randolph (11)
| Marc Gasol (6)
| Pepsi Center18,024
| 35–25
|- style="background:#cfc;"
| 61
| February 28
| Phoenix
| 
| Mike Conley Jr. (29)
| Zach Randolph (11)
| Mike Conley Jr. (8)
| FedExForum15,871
| 36–25

|- style="background:#fcc;"
| 62
| March 3
| @ Dallas
| 
| Mike Conley Jr. (30)
| Zach Randolph (10)
| Gasol, Conley Jr. (8)
| American Airlines Center19,480
| 36–26
|- style="background:#fcc;"
| 63
| March 4
| @ Houston
| 
| Mike Conley Jr. (23)
| JaMychal Green (10)
| Gasol, Conley Jr. (7)
| Toyota Center18,055
| 36–27
|- style="background:#fcc;"
| 64
| March 6
| Brooklyn
| 
| Mike Conley Jr. (32)
| JaMychal Green (9)
| Mike Conley Jr. (6)
| FedExForum15,505
| 36–28
|- style="background:#fcc;"
| 65
| March 9
| L.A. Clippers
| 
| Marc Gasol (20)
| Zach Randolph (11)
| Marc Gasol (5)
| FedExForum16,721
| 36–29
|- style="background:#fcc;"
| 66
| March 11
| Atlanta
| 
| JaMychal Green (20)
| JaMychal Green (11)
| Mike Conley Jr. (5)
| FedExForum17,523
| 36–30
|- style="background:#cfc;"
| 67
| March 13
| Milwaukee
| 
| Vince Carter (24)
| Gasol, Randolph (7)
| Mike Conley Jr. (10)
| FedExForum16,770
| 37–30
|-style="background:#cfc;"
| 68
| March 15
| @ Chicago
| 
| Gasol, Conley Jr. (27)
| Randolph, Conley Jr. (9)
| Gasol, Conley Jr. (7)
| United Center21,583
| 38–30
|- style="background:#cfc;"
| 69
| March 16
| @ Atlanta
| 
| Mike Conley Jr. (22)
| JaMychal Green (12)
| Mike Conley Jr. (12)
| Philips Arena17,063
| 39–30
|- style="background:#cfc;"
| 70
| March 18
| San Antonio
| 
| Mike Conley Jr. (19)
| Allen, Randolph, Conley Jr. (7)
| Marc Gasol (7)
| FedExForum18,119
| 40–30
|- style="background:#fcc;"
| 71
| March 21
| @ New Orleans
|  
| Mike Conley Jr. (16)
| Zach Randolph (10)
| Gasol, Carter (4)
| Smoothie King Center15,973
| 40–31
|- style="background:#fcc;"
| 72
| March 23
| @ San Antonio
| 
| Mike Conley Jr. (22)
| Marc Gasol (10)
| Mike Conley Jr. (6)
| AT&T Center18,418
| 40–32
|- style="background:#fcc;"
| 73
| March 26
| @ Golden State
| 
| Mike Conley Jr. (29)
| Randolph, Ennis (8)
| Mike Conley Jr. (6)
| Oracle Arena19,596
| 40–33
|- style="background:#fcc;"
| 74
| March 27
| @ Sacramento
| 
| Mike Conley Jr. (22)
| Zach Randolph (15)
| Mike Conley Jr. (9)
| Golden 1 Center17,608
| 40–34
|- style="background:#cfc;"
| 75
| March 29
| Indiana
| 
| Mike Conley Jr. (36)
| James Ennis (10)
| Mike Conley Jr. (6)
| FedExForum16,367
| 41–34
|- style="background:#cfc;"
| 76
| March 31
| Dallas
| 
| Mike Conley Jr. (28)
| Zach Randolph (12)
| Mike Conley Jr. (6)
| FedExForum17,317
| 42–34

|- style="background:#fcc;"
| 77
| April 2
| @ L. A. Lakers
| 
| Conley Jr., Daniels (20)
| Tony Allen (9)
| Mike Conley Jr. (12)
| Staples Center18,997
| 42–35
|- style="background:#fcc;"
| 78
| April 4
| @ San Antonio
| 
| Mike Conley Jr. (19)
| Zach Randolph (16)
| Marc Gasol (7)
| AT&T Center18,418
| 42–36
|- style="background:#fcc;"
| 79
| April 5
| Oklahoma City
| 
| Marc Gasol (23)
| Zach Randolph (9)
| Marc Gasol (5)
| FedExForum17,298
| 42–37
|- style="background:#cfc;"
| 80
| April 7
| New York
| 
| Mike Conley Jr. (31)
| Marc Gasol (10)
| Mike Conley Jr. (6) 
| FedExForum17,631
| 43–37
|- style="background:#fcc;"
| 81
| April 9
| Detroit
| 
| Mike Conley Jr. (15)
| JaMychal Green (7)
| Harrison, Gasol (5)
| FedExForum16,521
| 43–38
|- style="background:#fcc;"
| 82
| April 12
| Dallas
| 
| Conley Jr., Randolph (15)
| Marc Gasol (8)
| Carter, Gasol (4) 
| FedExForum16,274
| 43–39

Playoffs

|- style="background:#fcc;"
| 1
| April 15
| @ San Antonio
| 
| Marc Gasol (32)
| Conley, Gasol (5)
| Mike Conley (7)
| AT&T Center18,418
| 0–1
|- style="background:#fcc;"
| 2
| April 17
| @ San Antonio
| 
| Mike Conley Jr. (24)
| Zach Randolph (10)
| Mike Conley Jr. (8)
| AT&T Center18,418
| 0–2
|- style="background:#cfc;"
| 3
| April 20
| San Antonio
| 
| Mike Conley Jr. (24)
| Zach Randolph (8)
| Mike Conley Jr. (8)
| FedExForum18,119
| 1–2
|- style="background:#cfc;"
| 4
| April 22
| San Antonio
| 
| Mike Conley Jr. (35)
| Marc Gasol (12)
| Mike Conley Jr. (8)
| FedExForum18,119
| 2–2
|- style="background:#fcc;"
| 5
| April 25
| @ San Antonio
| 
| Mike Conley Jr. (26)
| Zach Randolph (6)
| Marc Gasol (7)
| AT&T Center18,418
| 2–3
|- style="background:#fcc;"
| 6
| April 27
| San Antonio
| 
| Mike Conley Jr. (26)
| Zach Randolph (11)
| Marc Gasol (6)
| FedExForum18,119
| 2–4

Transactions

Trades

Free agency

Re-signed

Additions

Subtractions

References

External links

Memphis Grizzlies seasons
Memphis Grizzlies
Memphis Grizzlies
Memphis Grizzlies
Events in Memphis, Tennessee